Andre Jorns (born January 11, 1951) is a former Swiss professional ice hockey goaltender who last played for HC Ambrì-Piotta in Switzerland's National League A.

Jorns has participated as a member of the Swiss national team at the 1976 Winter Olympics.

References

External links

Living people
EHC Arosa players
HC Ambrì-Piotta players
Swiss ice hockey goaltenders
1951 births
Ice hockey players at the 1976 Winter Olympics
Olympic ice hockey players of Switzerland